The 1899 Johns Hopkins Blue Jays football team represented Johns Hopkins University during the 1899 college football season.

Schedule

References

Johns Hopkins
Johns Hopkins Blue Jays football seasons
Maryland Intercollegiate Football Association football champion seasons
Johns Hopkins Blue Jays football